Several ships have been named Agincourt after the Battle of Agincourt of 1415.
 was a merchant vessel launched at North Shields. Her crew abandoned her in a leaking state in the Atlantic in December 1821.
 was launched at Ipswich. In 1822 she sailed to Bengal under a license from the British East India Company. She was last listed in 1828.
 merchant sailship was built at Monmouth. She was registered at Bristol in 1826. She was lost at Antigua on 29 January 1829 on her way to Nevis. Crew was saved but cargo lost.
, of 958 tons (bm), was launched at London. She traded with India and China and foundered on 24 June 1866 while sailing from Southampton to Hong Kong.
, of 543 tons (bm), was launched at Sunderland. In 1844 she sailed from Woolwich, England, and delivered convicts to Norfolk Island.

Ship names